Sherlock Brown is a 1922 American silent comedy-drama film. Directed by Bayard Veiller, the film stars Bert Lytell, Ora Carew, and Sylvia Breamer. It was released on June 26, 1922.

Cast list
 Bert Lytell as William Brown
 Ora Carew as Barbara Musgrave
 Sylvia Breamer as Hilda
 De Witt Jennings as J. J. Wallace
 Theodore Von Eltz as Frank Morton
 Wilton Taylor as Chief Bard
 Hardee Kirkland as General Bostwick
 George Barnum as Henry Stark
 George Kuwa as Sato

References

External links 

1922 films
American silent feature films
American black-and-white films
1920s English-language films
1922 comedy-drama films
Metro Pictures films
1920s American films
Silent American comedy-drama films